Robert Hillenbrand FBA (born 2 August 1941) is a British art historian who specialises in Persian and Islamic art. He is a professorial fellow of the universities of Edinburgh and St Andrews. He was Slade Professor of Fine Art at the University of Cambridge for 2008–09. He gave the 2010 Aspects of Art Lecture.

In 2018 during the conference of the Association of Iranian Studies at the University of California, Irvine, the Lifetime Achievement Award was awarded Hillenbrand. In the same year he appeared in the documentary film Taq Kasra: Wonder of Architecture as a scholar of Sassanid Persia.

Selected publications
 Imperial Images in Persian Painting
 Art and Archaeology of Ancient Persia (co-editor)
 Islamic Architecture in North Africa (co-author)
 Islamic Art and Architecture
 The Architecture of Ottoman Jerusalem: An Introduction
 Studies in Medieval Islamic Art and Architecture (2 vols.)
 Islamic Architecture. Form, Function and Meaning (translated into Persian in 1998)

Curated Exhibition
 Imperial images of Persian painting : a Scottish Arts Council exhibition (1977)

References

External links 
Robert Hillenbrand | University of St Andrews - Academia.edu
 
 
 
 

Living people
1941 births
Fellows of the British Academy
British art historians
Academics of the University of Edinburgh
Academics of the University of St Andrews
Alumni of the University of Cambridge
Alumni of the University of Oxford
Slade Professors of Fine Art (University of Cambridge)
Historians of Islamic art